Thinopyrum junceum, commonly named sand couch-grass, is a species of grass in the family Poaceae. It is found in Europe and temperate Asia, and grows from rhizomes. They have a self-supporting growth form and simple, broad leaves. Individuals can grow to 52 cm tall.

A relative of wheat, Thinopyrum junceum is salt-tolerant. A hybridization of the two creates a salt-tolerant wheat variety.

References

junceum